Manuel Enrique Ovalle Araiza (born 7 April 1968) is a Mexican politician affiliated with the National Action Party. He served as Deputy of the LIX Legislature of the Mexican Congress as a plurinominal representative, and previously served as a local deputy in the LI Legislature of the Congress of Querétaro.

References

1968 births
Living people
Politicians from Querétaro
Members of the Chamber of Deputies (Mexico)
National Action Party (Mexico) politicians
Deputies of the LIX Legislature of Mexico
Members of the Congress of Querétaro
20th-century Mexican politicians